The Precision Strike Missile (PrSM) is a tactical ballistic missile being developed by the United States Army to replace the ATACMS.

Development
In March 2016, Lockheed Martin, Boeing, and Raytheon announced they would offer a missile to meet the U.S. Army's Long Range Precision Fires (LRPF) requirement to replace the ATACMS. The PrSM will use advanced propulsion to fly faster and farther (originally out to ) while also being thinner and sleeker, increasing loadout to two per pod, doubling the number carried by M270 MLRS and M142 HIMARS launchers. Lockheed and Raytheon were involved in the competitive effort, but the latter left the competition in early 2020, leaving Lockheed Martin as the missile developer. The weapon is planned to achieve Initial Operational Capability in 2023; the initial PrSM will only be able to hit stationary targets on land, but later versions will track moving targets on land and sea. With the United States withdrawal from the Intermediate-Range Nuclear Forces Treaty, the range of the PrSM will be increased beyond the '499 km' limitation previously placed upon it by the treaty.

In June 2020, the Army had begun testing a new multi-mode seeker — an upgrade for the Precision Strike Missile — even though the missile would not enter service until 2023, the upgraded seeker is expected to be part of a major program improvement planned for 2025.

Advancements in designing and a potential ramjet could extend the weapon's range up to 1,000 kilometers.

In July 2021, the US announced that Australia had become a partner in the PrSM Program with the Australian Army signing a memorandum of understanding for Increment 2 of the program with the US Army's Defense Exports and Cooperation and had contributed . 

The United Kingdom, as part of an upgrade to the British Army’s M270 MLRS, has hinted that it may possibly acquire PrSM.

Operators

Future operators
 : Australian Army
 : British Army - Not confirmed
 : United States Army and United States Marine Corps

See also
 OpFires

References

External link

Rocket artillery
Tactical ballistic missiles of the United States